Thoosuchus (meaning "active crocodile") is an extinct genus of basal trematosauroid trematosaurian temnospondyl. Fossils have been found from Russia and date back to the Early Triassic. It is the type genus of the family Thoosuchidae, formerly called the subfamily Thoosuchinae and placed within Benthosuchidae. The benthosuchids were originally composed of the majority of basal trematosaurian forms regarded as the ancestors of the trematosaurids. Although the genus was first named in 1940, material from one species, E. yakovlevi, was originally tentatively referred to Trematosuchus in 1926.

For its family, Thoosuchus was fairly small, reaching a little over 60 cm with a 15 cm skull.
 
Thoosuchus superficially resembles the more derived trematosaurids, but can be distinguished from them on the basis of a deep, narrowing otic notch. It had widely spaced orbits and a moderately elongated skull roof that was well ornamented with ridges and grooves, especially on the parietals. This ornamentation is also a characteristic of trematosaurids and has been described as representing a "zone of intensive growth". The well developed lateral line system of Thoosuchus is indicative of its presumed aquatic lifestyle.

Russian paleontologist Ivan Yefremov [Efremov] named it Thoosuchus "active crocodile" (from Ancient Greek θοός (thoos) "nimble, active" and σοῦχος (soukhos) "crocodile") in 1940, "in view of its obviously more active mode of life in water than the mode of life of Benthosuchus" (page 13).

See also

 Prehistoric amphibian
 List of prehistoric amphibians

References

External links
Thoosuchus in the Paleobiology Database

Extinct animals of Russia
Triassic temnospondyls
Taxa named by Ivan Yefremov
Fossil taxa described in 1940
Prehistoric amphibian genera